A Maid Among Maids (Swedish: En piga bland pigor) is a 1924 Swedish silent comedy drama film directed by John W. Brunius and starring Magda Holm, Georg Blomstedt and Margit Manstad. It was shot at the Råsunda Studios in Stockholm. The film's sets were designed by the art director Ragnar Brattén. It was inspired by the 1914 book of the same title by Ester Blenda Nordström.

Cast
 Magda Holm as Alice Halling
 Georg Blomstedt as Per Olof Berg
 Nils Lundell as 	August
 Ella Lennartsson as 	Lotta
 Margit Manstad as Karin Halling
 Ester Halling as 	Anna
 Carlo Keil-Möller as Sven Bille
 Ragnar Arvedson as Faustino della Novarro
 Hugo Tranberg as Matts Stengårdh
 Ingeborg Strandin as 	Farmerwife
 Gustav Runsten as 	Second Farm-hand
 Rosa Tillman as 	Guest at ladyparty

References

Bibliography
 Sadoul, Georges. Dictionary of Film Makers. University of California Press, 1972.

External links

1924 films
1924 comedy films
Swedish comedy films
Swedish silent feature films
Swedish black-and-white films
Films directed by John W. Brunius
1920s Swedish-language films
Silent comedy films
1920s Swedish films